Frank Edwards (March 20, 1909 – March 22, 2002) was an American blues guitarist, harmonica player and singer. He was variously billed as Mr. Frank, Black Frank and Mr. Cleanhead.

Biography and career
Edwards was born in Washington, Georgia, United States.
 
He recorded for four record labels in his career; Okeh Records in 1940, Regal Records in 1949, and Trix Records in the mid-1970s. Some more recent sessions were done for the Music Maker Relief Foundation. His most noted recordings were "Three Women Blues" and "Terraplane Blues".

Frank Edwards died of a heart attack in Greenville, South Carolina, while being driven back to his Atlanta, Georgia home, after completing his final recordings at the age of 93.

References

External links
 Mrfrankedwards.com
 Frank Edwards page of the Atlanta Blues Society
 Illustrated Frank Edwards discography
 Frank Edwards obituary

1909 births
2002 deaths
People from Washington, Georgia
Country blues musicians
American blues singers
American blues guitarists
American male guitarists
20th-century American singers
20th-century American guitarists
20th-century American male singers